Emily Charlotte Meynell Ingram (1840-1904) was a British artist, traveller and the last resident of Temple Newsam House, Leeds. She was the daughter of Charles Wood, 1st Viscount Halifax.

Early life 
Born Emily Charlotte Wood, she was the second eldest of six children born to Sir Charles Woods and Lady Mary Woods (formally known as Grey). The Woods family were an old gentry family who were respectable York merchants. They reached this level of respectability through the discovery of coal on their ancestral estate; the great Barnsley field which help some of the Britain's richest and finest coal. In addition to this Sir Charles Woods had a successful political career, owning many seats in Garrowby and Pocklington near York; Hickleton near Doncaster and a home in London in Belgrave Square. She spent her childhood between Hickleton and London, in her diaries she described herself as a "joyous and head strong spirit". In according to J.G Lockhart her brothers colleague and biographer described her as being clever, capable but spoilt by her father making it hard for to interact with strangers as she could be difficult and dictatorial  She was largely involved in her father's  political career 

As a child she would often visit Buckingham palace, she was friends with princess Victoria, Helena and Louise, often visiting for them to play together. She was particularly close to her older brother Charles, whom she would later rely on after the passing of her husband in 1871.

Marriage and Temple Newsam 
In 1864 she married  Hugo Meynell-Ingram, who was the last surviving descendant of Sir Arthur Ingram. He was eighteen years older than her and they met at through a mutual friend (Lady Harcourt) whilst Emily was visiting Chiswick. They came from two very politically different houses the Woods, Emily's side of the family were Whig's. Whereas Hugo Meynell-Ingrams family were Tory. Once Emily and Hugo were married they spent most of their married lives at Hoar Cross in Staffordshire, using Temple Newsam as a place to stay when they went hunting. Hoar Cross was specifically built for the married couple by Henry Clutton in 1862.

When her husband died in 1871 from a hunting accident, she became a widow and childless at the age of 31 after 8 years of marriage. She was devastated by her husband's  death, to commemorate his memory she built a church near Hoar Cross Hall. Known as Hoar Cross Holy Angels Church. She inherited all of the Meynell Ingram properties and wealth. After losing her husband she came to rely on her family, with her younger brother (Fredrick) and his wife (Mary) who moved into Temple Newsam with her. In addition to this, she found great comfort in her Anglo-Catholic faith, spending time and money building new churches in memory of her husband  and investing in charitable institutions. During this period of mourning Emily Ingram devoted her time to renovating and improving Temple Newsam. She particularly spent time to Improving the Jacobean features of the house, between 1877-1900 the Library became a Chapel, she Jacobean-ised the Great Hall adding a grand oak staircase.

Emily was an ardent lover of art and a practising artist. In her prime she was an accomplished sketcher and water colourist, with most of her work being passed down through the Meynell-Ingram descendants. She had acquired a large collection primarily from the 17th century. Coincidentally, prior to owning the collection, in a letter to her brother on 5 June 1860 she wrote about her love of 17th Century art and how she hoped to own some paintings of her own from the period. Due to the values of the time and her religious beliefs any pieces in her collection which were thought to be distasteful or erotic were either disposed of or cleaned up concealing any offensive elements.

In addition to all the estates and wealth Emily inherited from her marriage, she became the proud owner of the a 360-ton schooner (yacht) with a full-time crew of over thirty people. She would take the yacht sailing for a few weeks every year, usually travelling through Europe and Mediterranean; with a party of friends and family to escape the formalities and restrictions of everyday.  She would often bringing back artefacts from her travels for her homes or churches.

Through her inheritance, charity work and renovations, Emily Ingram became one of the richest and most independent women in the country. Often throwing lavish dinners and shooting parties. One highlight of her social career was hosting King George V and Queen Mary in 1894 on their official visit to Leeds.

Emily Charlotte Meynell-Ingram died in 1904 at Temple Newsam House, her funeral was held at Hoar Cross Hall and was buried next to her husband at Hoar Cross Holy Angels Church. Since she and Hugo did not have any children, the Meynell-Ingram estates and wealth were passed down to her nephew.

Today Temple Newsam House is maintained by Leeds City Council under Leeds Museums and Galleries. Hoar Cross Hall is now a spa resort with parts of the grounds being used a car park.

Religion and Buildings

Emily Ingram was a well known and prominent Anglo-catholic, her family were heavily involved in the Anglo-catholic religion and church. Her Brother Charles Lindley Wood was the president of the English Church Union from 1868 to 1919. Between 1972-1876, Emily Ingram had the Hoar Cross church of Holy angels built in remembrance of her husband. Within the church there is a chapel containing two marble effigies; one of Hugo Meynell- Ingram and the other of Emily Meynell Ingram lying next to each other. She hired the architect George Fredrick Bodley to build the church and was in charge of the furnishing within it. The church is decorated with marble flooring, reredos, screens and a front cover. Emily also added several souvenirs from her travels. She also commissioned the buildings of the churches St Edwards in Holbeck (Leeds) and Altofts using her own expenses. Additionally, she was involved in the restoration of churches in  Laughton.

Being a devoted Anglo Catholic she would hold services on her yacht, the Ariadne. In addition to the many churches Emily Ingram built or renovated, she built a church home for boys, near Hoar Cross. In 1963 a magazine called Our Waifs and Strays reported that some of the boys had seen sightings of a friendly and useful ally thought to be Emily Ingram's ghost. The home was later closed in 1983.

See also
 Hugo Meynell-Ingram
 Temple Newsam

References

External links 
https://museumsandgalleries.leeds.gov.uk/temple-newsam/

1840 births
1904 deaths
Leeds Museums and Galleries Project